Carl Ludwig Siegel (31 December 1896 – 4 April 1981) was a German mathematician specialising in analytic number theory. He is known for, amongst other things, his contributions to the Thue–Siegel–Roth theorem in Diophantine approximation, Siegel's method, Siegel's lemma and the Siegel mass formula for quadratic forms. He was named as one of the most important mathematicians of the 20th century.

André Weil, without hesitation, named Siegel as the greatest mathematician of the first half of the 20th century. Atle Selberg said of Siegel and his work:

Biography
Siegel was born in Berlin, where he enrolled at the Humboldt University in Berlin in 1915 as a student in mathematics, astronomy, and physics. Amongst his teachers were Max Planck and Ferdinand Georg Frobenius, whose influence made the young Siegel abandon astronomy and turn towards number theory instead. His best-known student was Jürgen Moser, one of the founders of KAM theory (Kolmogorov–Arnold–Moser), which lies at the foundations of chaos theory. Another notable student was Kurt Mahler, the number theorist.

Siegel was an antimilitarist, and in 1917, during World War I he was committed to a psychiatric institute as a conscientious objector. According to his own words, he withstood the experience only because of his support from Edmund Landau, whose father had a clinic in the neighborhood. After the end of World War I, he enrolled at the University of Göttingen, studying under Landau, who was his doctoral thesis supervisor (PhD in 1920). He stayed in Göttingen as a teaching and research assistant; many of his groundbreaking results were published during this period. In 1922, he was appointed professor at the Johann Wolfgang Goethe-Universität of Frankfurt am Main as the successor of Arthur Moritz Schönflies. Siegel, who was deeply opposed to Nazism, was a close friend of the docents Ernst Hellinger and Max Dehn and used his influence to help them. This attitude prevented Siegel's appointment as a successor to the chair of Constantin Carathéodory in Munich. In Frankfurt he took part with Dehn, Hellinger, Paul Epstein, and others in a seminar on the history of mathematics, which was conducted at the highest level. In the seminar they read only original sources. Siegel's reminiscences about the time before World War II are in an essay in his collected works.

In 1936 he was a Plenary Speaker at the ICM in Oslo. In 1938, he returned to Göttingen before emigrating in 1940 via Norway to the United States, where he joined the Institute for Advanced Study in Princeton, where he had already spent a sabbatical in 1935. He returned to Göttingen after World War II, when he accepted a post as professor in 1951, which he kept until his retirement in 1959. In 1968 he was elected a foreign associate of the U.S. National Academy of Sciences.

Career
Siegel's work on number theory, diophantine equations, and celestial mechanics in particular won him numerous honours. In 1978, he was awarded the first Wolf Prize in Mathematics, one of the most prestigious in the field. When the prize committee decided to select the greatest living mathematician, the discussion centered around Siegel and Israel Gelfand as the leading candidates. The prize was ultimately split between them.

Siegel's work spans analytic number theory; and his theorem on the finiteness of the integer points of curves, for genus > 1, is historically important as a major general result on diophantine equations, when the field was essentially undeveloped. He worked on L-functions, discovering the (presumed illusory) Siegel zero phenomenon. His work, derived from the Hardy–Littlewood circle method on quadratic forms, appeared in the later, adele group theories encompassing the use of theta-functions. The Siegel modular varieties, which describe Siegel modular forms, are recognised as part of the moduli theory of abelian varieties. In all this work the structural implications of analytic methods show through.

In the early 1970s Weil gave a series of seminars on the history of number theory prior to the 20th century and he remarked that Siegel once told him that when the first person discovered the simplest case of Faulhaber's formula then, in Siegel's words, "Es gefiel dem lieben Gott." (It pleased the dear Lord.) Siegel was a profound student of the history of mathematics and put his studies to good use in such works as the Riemann–Siegel formula.

Works
by Siegel:
Transcendental numbers, 1949
Analytic functions of several complex variables, Stevens 1949; 2008 pbk editionGesammelte Werke (Collected Works), 3 Bände, Springer 1966
with Jürgen Moser Lectures on Celestial mechanics 1971, based upon the older work Vorlesungen über Himmelsmechanik, Springer 1956On the history of the Frankfurt Mathematics Seminar, Mathematical Intelligencer Vol.1, 1978/9, No. 4Über einige Anwendungen diophantischer Approximationen, Sitzungsberichte der Preussischen Akademie der Wissenschaften 1929 (sein Satz über Endlichkeit Lösungen ganzzahliger Gleichungen)Transzendente Zahlen, BI Hochschultaschenbuch 1967Vorlesungen über Funktionentheorie, 3 Bde. (auch in Bd.3 zu seinen Modulfunktionen, English translation "Topics in Complex Function Theory", 3 Vols., Wiley)Symplectic geometry, Elsevier 1943Advanced analytic number theory, Tata Institute of Fundamental Research 1980Lectures on the Geometry of Numbers, Springer 1989
Letter to Louis J. Mordell, March 3, 1964.

about Siegel:
Harold Davenport: Reminiscences on conversations with Carl Ludwig Siegel, Mathematical Intelligencer 1985, Nr.2
Helmut Klingen, Helmut Rüssmann, Theodor Schneider: Carl Ludwig Siegel, Jahresbericht DMV, Bd.85, 1983(Zahlentheorie, Himmelsmechanik, Funktionentheorie)
Jean Dieudonné: Article in Dictionary of Scientific Biography
Eberhard Freitag: Siegelsche Modulfunktionen, Jahresbericht DMV, vol. 79, 1977, pp. 79–86
Hel Braun: Eine Frau und die Mathematik 1933–1940, Springer 1990 (Reminiscence)
Constance Reid: Hilbert, as well as  Courant, Springer (The two biographies contain some information on Siegel.)
Max Deuring: Carl Ludwig Siegel, 31. Dezember 1896 – 4. April 1981, Acta Arithmetica, Vol. 45, 1985, pp. 93–113, online and Publications list
Goro Shimura: "1996 Steele Prizes" (with Shimura's reminiscences concerning C. L. Siegel), Notices of the AMS, Vol. 43, 1996, pp. 1343–7, pdf
Serge Lang: Mordell's Review, Siegel's letter to Mordell, diophantine geometry and 20th century mathematics'', Notices American Mathematical Society 1995, in Gazette des Mathematiciens 1995,

See also
 Bourget's hypothesis
 Siegel's conjecture
 Siegel's number
 Siegel disk
 Siegel's lemma
 Siegel upper half-space
 Siegel–Weil formula
 Siegel parabolic subgroup
 Smith–Minkowski–Siegel mass formula
 Riemann–Siegel formula
 Riemann–Siegel theta function
 Siegel–Shidlovsky theorem
 Siegel–Walfisz theorem
 Siegel's theorem (Minkowski–Hlawka theorem)

References

External links

 Freddy Litten Die Carathéodory-Nachfolge in München 1938–1944
 85. Vol. Heft 4 der DMV (with 3 articles about Siegel's life and works) (PDF; 6,77 MB)
Siegel Approximation algebraischer Zahlen, Mathematische Zeitschrift, vol.10, 1921, Dissertation
Siegel „Additive Zahlentheorie in Zahlkörpern“, 1921, Jahresbericht DMV
Website University Göttingen with biography and additional explanations

1896 births
1981 deaths
20th-century German mathematicians
University of Göttingen alumni
Academic staff of the University of Göttingen
Academic staff of Goethe University Frankfurt
Institute for Advanced Study faculty
Number theorists
Wolf Prize in Mathematics laureates
Knights Commander of the Order of Merit of the Federal Republic of Germany
Recipients of the Pour le Mérite (civil class)
Foreign associates of the National Academy of Sciences
Members of the Royal Swedish Academy of Sciences